The 1966–67 European Cup was the second edition of the European Cup, IIHF's premier European club ice hockey tournament. The season started on November 17, 1966, and finished on April 4, 1967.

The tournament was won by ZKL Brno, who beat Ilves in the final.

First round

 Újpesti Dózsa,  
 HK CSKA Sofia,  
 Dynamo Berlin,   
 Podhale Nowy Targ:  bye

Second round

Third round

 ZKL Brno,   
 CSKA Moscow:  bye

Semifinals

Finals

References 
 Season 1967

1
1967